Pepijn Maxime Smits (born 9 December 1996) is a Dutch swimmer.

He competed in the Team event at the 2018 European Aquatics Championships, winning the gold medal.

References

1996 births
Living people
Dutch male long-distance swimmers
Dutch male freestyle swimmers
European Aquatics Championships medalists in swimming
21st-century Dutch people